Yenimuhacir is a town in Keşan district of Edirne Province, Turkey,  It is situated in the Eastern Thrace plains at . The population of Yenimuhacir is 2045 as of 2011.

History

The old name of this village was Bulgarköy ("Bulgarian village"). It was a Bulgarian settlement during the Ottoman era. During the destruction of the local Bulgarians on July 7, 1913, the Ottoman Army surrounded Bulgarköy and proceeded to massacre between 450 and 1100 inhabitants (depending on source), including women and children, burning the village to the ground in the process.

References

Populated places in Keşan District
Towns in Turkey